Centipede Nunatak is a narrow nunatak that is  long, located  north-northwest of Ford Rock in central Hut Point Peninsula, Ross Island. The name is allusive; snow that cuts across parts of the nunatak gives it a segmented appearance resembling that of a centipede. It was named by the Advisory Committee on Antarctic Names in 2000.

References 

Nunataks of Ross Island